Area codes 757 and 948 are telephone area codes in the North American Numbering Plan (NANP) for the southeast corner of Virginia. Area code 757 was established July 1, 1996 in an area code split of area code 804. Area code 948 was established on February 5, 2020 forming an overlay with area code 757.

The service area comprises the Eastern Shore of Virginia, i.e. the Virginia portion of the Delmarva Peninsula, and
the vast majority of the Hampton Roads metropolitan area, which includes the Virginia Peninsula with Newport News, Hampton, and Williamsburg, and Poquoson, and South Hampton Roads, with Virginia Beach, Norfolk, Chesapeake, Portsmouth, Franklin, and Suffolk.

Before the implementation of number pooling, 757 was projected to run out of numbers as early as 2002. A plan was developed that would have created a concentrated overlay in the Hampton Roads metro area leaving all of the Eastern Shore in 757. This would have made ten-digit dialing mandatory in southeastern Virginia. However, this plan was never implemented.

In April 2019, it was announced that a plan for an overlay area code was proposed, with the pool of numbers for the 757 code projected at the time to run out in late 2021. On February 5, 2020 it was announced that this all-service overlay area code will be 948. In March 2022, Verizon announced that the overlay would be implemented starting on April 9, 2022, with area code 948 to officially take effect on May 9. This made ten-digit dialing mandatory in 757/948, with recorded messages passed on to callers dialling the old method. 

An overlay was chosen over the option of splitting 757. A split could have meant Virginia Beach, Chesapeake, and Norfolk, for example, retaining 757 and the rest of the area changing to 948, or vice versa. The NANPA decided, and the State Corporation Commission agreed, that simply requiring everyone to dial ten digits instead of seven would have caused far fewer problems than the inconveniences that would be caused by an area code split.

"757" is commonly used as a general geographic descriptor for the Hampton Roads and Virginia Peninsula region. The Hampton Roads Chamber and the Virginia Peninsula Chamber of Commerce have recommended its use in tourism branding.

See also
List of Virginia area codes
List of NANP area codes

References

External links

757
757